The Czech Republic women's national under-18 and under-19  is a national basketball team of Czech Republic and is governed by the Czech Basketball Federation. 
It represents Czech Republic in international under-19 and under-18 (under age 19 and under age 18) women's basketball competitions.

FIBA Under-19 World Championship for women

See also
 Czech Republic women's national basketball team
 Czech Republic women's national under-17 basketball team
 Czech Republic men's national under-19 basketball team

References

under
Women's national under-19 basketball teams